Shimna Integrated College is an integrated secondary school based in Newcastle, County Down, Northern Ireland. The all-ability school was founded in 1994 with the hope of integrating young people from both sides of Northern Ireland's religious divide and giving all of its students 'self-esteem'.

Context
Integrated Education is a Northern Ireland phenomenon, where traditionally schools were sectarian, either run as Catholic schools or Protestant schools. On as parental request, a school could apply to 'transition' to become Grant Maintained offering 30% of the school places to students from the minority community. Lagan College was the first integrated school to open in 1981.

History
It opened in September 1995 with 60 pupils.
In March 2011, Shimna became the first school in Northern Ireland to organize a gay-straight alliance.

Site
The original buildings are in the process of being replaced with a  £16.5m three storey building that meets 2021 design requirements. The plans were approved at the planning committee meeting in April 2021  with completion predicted for September 2023.

See also 
 List of integrated schools in Northern Ireland
 List of secondary schools in Northern Ireland

References

External links
 Official school website

Secondary schools in County Down
Integrated schools in County Down
Newcastle, County Down